Black Ćuprija, is a World War II monument in Serbia. The monument was designed by Jovan Soldatović in 1962. The memorial is listed as one of the Historic Landmarks of Great Importance in Serbia.

Part of the monument was stolen in 2009.

See also
Axis occupation of Vojvodina
List of Yugoslav World War II monuments and memorials in Serbia

References

Historic Landmarks of Great Importance
Monuments and memorials in Serbia
World War II monuments and memorials in Serbia
Žabalj